PeekYou is a people search engine that indexes people and their links on the web. Founded in April 2006 by Michael Hussey, PeekYou claims that they have indexed over 250 million people, mostly in the United States and Canada.  The search results consist of publicly available URLs, including Facebook, LinkedIn, Wikipedia, Google+, blogs, homepages, business pages and news sources.

See also
Information broker

Further reading 
"PeekYou - Spock has Competition" at Techcrunch
"PeekYou Makes People Search Worthwhile with Google Integration" at Mashable
"PeekYou’s Hussey Offers Glimpse Into Data Practices" at Adotas
"'Scrapers' Dig Deep for Data on Web" at Wall Street Journal

References

External links
 

Internet search engines
American companies established in 2006
2006 establishments in New York City
Companies based in New York City
Data brokers
Internet properties established in 2006